The Bangs-Wineman Block on Fourth St., Devils Lake, North Dakota, USA, was built in 1895. It has also been known as Glicksons Department Store. It was listed on the National Register of Historic Places in 1985.

Its 1985 NRHP nomination does not identify an architect for the building, but it is included in the 1989 NRHP-listed Devils Lake Commercial District, where "John A. Shannon", which appears to be a misstatement of the local architect Joseph A. Shannon, is named.

References

Commercial buildings on the National Register of Historic Places in North Dakota
Neoclassical architecture in North Dakota
Commercial buildings completed in 1895
National Register of Historic Places in Ramsey County, North Dakota
Individually listed contributing properties to historic districts on the National Register in North Dakota
Historic department store buildings in the United States
1895 establishments in North Dakota